Creeve is a civil parish and townland in County Roscommon, Ireland.

References

External links
Topographical Survey, 1837
Rural electrification of Creeve

Civil parishes of County Roscommon
Townlands of County Roscommon
Church of Ireland parishes in the Republic of Ireland